Suwon Samsung Bluewings Academy is the academy team of the Suwon Samsung Bluewings. This team is currently competing in the K League Junior and Korea National Youth Football League.

U-18 (Maetan High School FC)

Current squad 
As of March 14, 2012

Staff 
 Manager:  Cho Hyun-Doo
 Coach:  Kim Jae-Ho
 GK Coach:  Kim Dae-Hwan

Former players 
 2010
 Joo Jae-Hyun. Now in Suwon Samsung Bluewings.
 Min Sang-Gi. Now in Suwon Samsung Bluewings.
 2011
 Kwon Tae-An. Now in Suwon Samsung Bluewings.
 Noh Hyung-Gu. Now in Suwon Samsung Bluewings.
 Kim Seung-Min. Now in Suwon Samsung Bluewings.
 Lee Jong-Sung. Now in Suwon Samsung Bluewings.
 Shin Yeon-Soo. Now in Suwon Samsung Bluewings.
 Koo Ja-Ryong. Now in Suwon Samsung Bluewings.
 2012
 Kim Kwan-Chul. Now in Suwon Samsung Bluewings.

K League U-18 Challenge League Records

K League U-18 Challenge League Knockout Stage Records

Honours 
 K League U-18 Challenge League
 Winners (2) : 2010, 2012

U-15 (Maetan Middle School FC)

Current squad 
As of March 14, 2012

U-12 (Little Wings)

Current squad 
As of March 14, 2012

See also 
 Suwon Samsung Bluewings
 K League U-18 Challenge League

References

External links 
 Suwon Bluewings Official Website 
 K League U-18 Challenge League Official Website 
 Maetan High School Website 

Academy
K League academies
2007 establishments in South Korea